Alexandru Teriachiu (1829 – March 2, 1893) was a Romanian politician who served as the Minister of Foreign Affairs.

Life and career
Teriachiu was born in 1829 in Tecuci, Principality of Moldavia. He studied in Paris and was active in Romanian student organization at the university. He returned to Moldova after unification of Romanian and Moldavian principalities and became a member of the Tecici Union, deputy secretary of ad hoc Divan in 1856.

Teriachiu served as the Minister of Culture and Public Instruction from April 27, 1859, until April 3, 1860, Minister of Foreign Affairs from August 17, 1867, until November 12, 1867, and as the Minister of Internal Affairs from July 20, 1880, until April 5, 1881.

References

Sources
Stan Stoica (coord.) - Dicționar biografic de istorie a României (Ed. Meronia, București, 2008)

1829 births
1893 deaths
Romanian Ministers of Foreign Affairs
Members of the Ad hoc Divans
Romanian Ministers of Interior